Aşağı Noxudlu (also, Ashagy Nokhudlu, Nizhmye Nokhudly, and Nizhniye Nokhudly) is a village and municipality in the Salyan Rayon of Azerbaijan.  It has a population of 1,716.

References 

Populated places in Salyan District (Azerbaijan)